Parasports are sports played by people with a disability, including physical and intellectual disabilities. Some parasports are forms of adapted physical activities from existing able-bodied sports, while others have been specifically created for persons with a disability and do not have an able-bodied equivalent. Disability exists in four categories: physical, mental, permanent and temporary. At a competitive level, disability sport classifications are applied to allow people of varying abilities to face similar opposition.

Etymology
The term "parasports" arose as a portmanteau of the words paraplegic and sports. Though the sport has since included athletes of disabilities other than paraplegia, the term persists as a catch-all. Other terms for the concept include adapted sports, adaptive sports, disability sports, and disabled sports. The term Paralympic sports may also be used interchangeably with parasports, though technically this only refers to sports contested at the Paralympic Games.

Organization and history
Organized sport for athletes with a disability is generally divided into three broad disability groups: the deaf, people with physical disabilities, and people with intellectual disabilities. Each group has a distinct history, organization, competition program, and approach to sport.

Hearing impairment
Formal international competition in deaf sport began with the 1924 Paris Silent Games, organized by the Comité International des Sports des Sourds, CISS (The International Committee of Sports for the Deaf). These games evolved into the modern Deaflympics, governed by the CISS, which maintains separate games for deaf athletes based on their numbers, their special communication needs on the sports field, and the social interaction that is a vital part of sports.

Intellectual disability
Sports for persons with intellectual disabilities began to be organized in the 1960s through the Special Olympics movement. This grew out of a series of summer camps organized by Eunice Kennedy Shriver, beginning in 1962. In 1968 the first international Special Olympics were held, in Chicago. Today, Special Olympics provides training and competition in a variety of sports for persons with intellectual disabilities.

In 1986, the International Sports Federation for Persons with Intellectual Disability (INAS-FID) was formed to support elite competition for athletes with intellectual disabilities. This was established in contrast to the more participative, "sport for all" approach of Special Olympics. For a time, athletes with intellectual disabilities were included in the Paralympic Games. After a cheating scandal at the 2000 Summer Paralympics, where a number of athletes participating in intellectual disability events were revealed to not be disabled, INAS-FID athletes were banned from Paralympic competition, but the ban on intellectually disabled athletes has since been lifted.

Physical disability
Organized sport for persons with physical disabilities existed as early as 1911, when the "Cripples Olympiad" was held in the U.S.A. One of the successful athletes was Walter William Francis, a Welshman, who won both the running and wrestling championships. Later, events often developed out of rehabilitation programs. Following the Second World War, in response to the needs of large numbers of injured ex-service members and civilians, sport was introduced as a key part of rehabilitation. Sport for rehabilitation grew into recreational sport and then into competitive sport. The pioneer of this approach was Sir Ludwig Guttmann of the Stoke Mandeville Hospital in England. In 1948, while the Olympic Games were being held in London, he organized a sports competition for wheelchair athletes at Stoke Mandeville. This was the origin of the Stoke Mandeville Games, from which evolved both the IWAS World Games and the Paralympic Games. The first official Paralympic Games, which were simultaneously the 9th International Stoke Mandeville Games ('international' having been added when Dutch service personnel first took part in the Games in 1952), were held in Rome in 1960. The 2nd, 3rd and 4th Paralympic Games were simultaneously the 13th, 17th and 21st international Stoke Mandeville Games.

Sports for persons with physical disabilities began to be organized in the US in the late 1960s through Disabled Sports USA. Disabled Sports USA was established in 1967 by disabled military veterans, including Jim Winthers, to help rehabilitate the injured soldiers returning from Vietnam and originally named the National Amputee Skiers Association. In 1970, Hal O'Leary founded the National Sports Center for the Disabled (NSCD) at Winter Park in Colorado. Today, NSCD has 19 certified instructors and more than 1,000 volunteers. Disabled Sports USA has become one of the largest national multi-sport, multi-disability organizations in the United States, serving more than 60,000 wounded warriors, youth and adults annually.

In 1975, the Paralympic Games expanded to include those with limb amputations and visual impairments. Individuals with cerebral palsy were allowed to compete beginning in 1980.

Since 1988, the International Olympic Committee has chosen to validate Disabled Sports (physical disabilities) and incorporate it as a part of the Games: the staging of the Paralympic Games immediately follows the Olympic Games. This scheduling helps to foster greater interest in disabled sports. An investigation published on a Swiss website has shown that more and more International Sports Federations list disabled athletes than any other sportsmen or sportswomen.

In 2006, the Extremity Games were formed for people with limb loss or limb difference to compete in extreme sports. College Park Industries, a manufacturer of prosthetic feet, organized this event to give amputee athletes a venue to compete in this increasingly popular sports genre also referred to as action sports. This annual event held in the summer in Orlando, includes competitions in skateboarding, wakeboarding, rock climbing, mountain biking, surfing, moto-x and kayaking. Various organizations, such as Paradox Sports, have arisen to help empower and inspire disabled people through equipping and welcoming them into the extreme sports community.

Also in 2006, The Federation de Internationale Powerchair Football Association and The United States Power Soccer Association were formed to standardize the rules of play and promote one of the few competitive team sports for motorized wheelchair users. Powerchair football (or power soccer).

In 2007, a group of athletes, coaches, volunteers, and parents based in San Diego split from Special Olympics Southern California to gain local control over disabled athletics programs. This group – SPORTS for Exceptional Athletes (S4EA) – serves people with developmental disabilities within the age range of 5 years old through adults. By combining people with and without disabilities, S4EA hopes that participating athletes will interact and form lasting bonds of friendship through shared sports and recreational activities in S4EA's served communities. Although the organization's focus is primarily San Diego County, S4EA has grown from this base to satellite programs in Ventura and Temecula, California.

Currently, Paralympic sport is governed by the International Paralympic Committee, in conjunction with a wide range of other international sport organizations.

Today, there are many sport opportunities throughout the United States for injured service members, including cycling, shooting, wheelchair tennis and basketball, track and field, adapted water sports, and snow skiing. The Army Wounded Warrior Program offers sitting volleyball to injured service members, and some organizations also offer sport opportunities to family and friends of injured service members in addition to the members themselves. Two Paralympic-style multi-sport events exist exclusively for wounded, injured or sick armed services personnel and veterans: the Warrior Games in the United States and the Invictus Games which originated in the United Kingdom.

Sports

A wide range of sports have been adapted to be played by people with various disabilities, as well as several that are unique just to disabled athletes, such as goalball. Within each movement, different sports are practiced at different levels; for example, not all sports in the Paralympic movement are part of the Paralympic Games. In addition, many sports are practiced by persons with a disability outside the formal sports movements.

Adapted sports help society learn about disability. They also can help remove some of the stigma associated with having a disability.

Training
There is evidence to support that the use of inspiratory muscle training (IMT) as a training intervention can be implemented to increase the aerobic fitness, respiratory function, and overall quality of life in this population of athletes. Inspiratory Muscle Training in particular has been shown to improve respiratory muscle function and might help to reduce dyspnea on exertion. Long term physiological adaptations through prolonged training demonstrated within athletes with disabilities include increased respiratory volume, improved executive functions and increased reaction time among other benefits in relation to non athletes in the same age group.

Inclusion
Beginning in the late 1980s and early 1990s, work began within several countries and organizations to include athletes with disabilities in the non-disabled sport system. This included adding events for athletes with disabilities to major games such as the Olympic Games and the Commonwealth Games, and integration of these athletes into non-disabled sports organizations.
Since 1984, the Olympics have included exhibition events for Paralympic athletes. However, integration of full medal events has not taken place, and the status of athletes with a disability in the Olympic movement remains controversial.
Within the Commonwealth Games, athletes with a disability were first included in 1990 Auckland Commonwealth Games, then at the exhibition events in 1994, and at the 2002 Manchester Commonwealth Games they were included as full members of their national teams, making these the first fully inclusive international multi-sport games. This policy has continued with the 2006 Melbourne Commonwealth Games, where Canadian Chantal Petitclerc became the first athlete with a disability to carry her country's flag in the Opening Ceremonies of an integrated games.
Individual athletes such as swimmer Natalie du Toit and track athlete Oscar Pistorius have competed as equals against able bodied athletes at various events including the Olympic Games.

2013 the FIFA decided that Austrian footballer Martin Hofbauer can continue to play competitive football with prosthetics after he lost his right lower leg due to cancer.

The self-determination theory has been one of the most proven theories on how athletes participate in competitions of this level. Studies have supported this theory especially in intellectually or developmentally disabled athletes. Studies have continued to question the motivation for joining such competitions like the Special Olympics as well as the Paralympic Games. The Motivations for joining the Special Olympics uncover themes among individuals and families for their participation or abstention from these Olympic programs.

There are specific strategies that may be employed to increase inclusion of people with disabilities in sports. This includes modifying rules or adapting activities for a particular individual. As well, maintaining a non-competitive focus helps to increase the inclusion of participants with disabilities.

Including children with intellectual disabilities in sports programs in which they play with non-disabled athletes results in these children becoming more involved in mainstream sports, incorporating more physical activity in their daily lives and it increases their interactions with children who are not disabled. It is important for children with disabilities to get different types of support while participating in sports programs, for example, direct support from coaches and other athletes, indirect support from parents and non-human support from therapy dogs. Activities should be modified to suit different types of children's abilities and inclusivity is easier when activities are non-competitive.

Unified sports
"Unified sports" involve heterogeneous teams with athletes of mixed ability. Since the 1990s, Special Olympics Unified Sports have been promoting social inclusion through shared sports training and competition. This initiative has expanded globally and now involves more than 700,000 players in 127 countries worldwide. The principle behind unified sports is simple: training together and playing together is a quick path to friendship and understanding.

The NBA has been a major supporter of Unified Sports, sponsoring the annual NBA Cares Special Olympics Unified Basketball Game during the NBA All-Star Weekend. The Walt Disney Company, ESPN and Special Olympics are also working on a two-year global initiative that will leverage the power of sports to promote an environment of social inclusion and acceptance.

Disabled drivers have competed in motorsport versus fully able drivers; for example Alex Zanardi, Albert Llovera, Clay Regazzoni and Jason Watt.

See also
 Assistive technology in sport
 ASEAN ParaGames
 Défi sportif
 FESPIC Games
 IWAS World Games
 Special Hockey
 1st World Deaf Ice Hockey and Curling Championships
 World Deaf Football Championships

References

External links

 International Paralympic Committee
 Deaflympics
 Special Olympics

 
Sports by type